Rede Nacional de Ensino e Pesquisa (RNP) (National Education and Research Network) is Brazil's academic Internet backbone. It was created in 1989 and the network started being built in 1991.

RNP has 27 points of presence, one on each of the 26 Brazilian states and on the Federal District. It connects 15 state networks and over 600 institutions.

See also
National Research and Education Network

External links
Rede Nacional de Ensino e Pesquisa
List of connected institutions (in Portuguese)

Internet in Brazil
National research and education networks